The National, originally titled for sponsorship reasons as the AT&T National and later as the Quicken Loans National, was a professional golf tournament on the PGA Tour from 2007 to 2018. It was hosted by Tiger Woods and benefited the Tiger Woods Foundation. It was usually held either in late June or during the Fourth of July weekend in the Washington, D.C. area, except for 2010 and 2011 when it was held near Philadelphia.

The National was a 72-hole stroke play tournament. It was one of a few events given "invitational" status by the PGA Tour and consequently had a field of only 120 players, as opposed to 156 players at most full-field tournaments.

The first edition of The National in 2007 was held July 5–8 on the Blue Course at the Congressional Country Club in Bethesda, Maryland, northwest of Washington. The event returned to Congressional in 2008 and 2009 when it was held midway between the U.S. Open and The Open Championship to ensure a strong field of competitors. The National was part of the Open Qualifying Series that gave non-exempt players a chance to compete in The Open.

History
The event was officially announced on March 7, 2007, to replace The International, which tour officials had abruptly cancelled four weeks earlier on  The National was a standard 72-hole stroke play event, and did not use the modified Stableford scoring system used by The International in Colorado.

The D.C. area had hosted a regular tour event for over a quarter century; the Kemper Open arrived in 1980, but was terminated after the 2006 event. It was played at Congressional from 1980 to 1986, then moved to the nearby TPC at Avenel in 1987. Later renamed the Booz Allen Classic, it returned to Congressional in 2005, to give Avenel time to undergo renovations, which did 

Congressional originally agreed to host the event for the first two years, and after opting out of hosting the 2009 U.S. Amateur, agreed to host the event in 2009 as well. The Aronimink Golf Club in Newtown Square, Pennsylvania, hosted the 2010 and 2011 events, due to Congressional being reconfigured for the 2011 U.S. Open.  The tournament was played at Congressional from 2012 to 2014 and returned in 2016. It was played in Virginia at Robert Trent Jones Golf Club in Gainesville in July and August 2015 and was played at TPC Potomac at Avenel Farm in Potomac in 2017.

Other courses that were originally considered for the new tournament were in the Kansas City, Minneapolis-Saint Paul, and Portland areas. Possible sites for the 2010 and 2011 events were the TPC at Avenel (now TPC Potomac at Avenel Farm, former site of the Booz Allen Classic) and Robert Trent Jones Golf Club, (four-time host of the Presidents Cup). CBS Sports and Golf Channel currently carry the Quicken Loans National on television.

After the 2017 tournament, the Quicken Loans sponsorship deal ended leaving The National with no sponsor for  scheduled for June 28 to July 1. The PGA Tour also announced that it would be buying out the remaining two years of its contract with Congressional Country Club to host the 2018 and 2020  Despite a lack of title sponsor and host course, PGA Tour commissioner Jay Monahan confirmed that the event would occur in 2018, stating, "We made the commitment. Our players are going to be showing up there and we're going to be playing for that amount of money." On May 30, less than a month before the event, Quicken Loans agreed to sponsor for a fifth  On July 10, 2018, it was announced that the Detroit Golf Club would host the Rocket Mortgage Classic in 2019, replacing The National.

Field
The National was one of a few tournaments given "invitational" status by the PGA Tour, and consequently it had a reduced field of only 120 players (as opposed to most full-field open tournaments with a field of 156 players). Other tournaments with invitational status include the Arnold Palmer Invitational, the RBC Heritage, the Fort Worth Invitational, and the Memorial Tournament.

Invitational tournaments have smaller fields (between 100 and 132 players), and have more freedom than full-field open tournaments in determining which players are eligible to participate in their event, as invitational tournaments are not required to fill their fields using the PGA Tour Priority Ranking System.  Furthermore, unlike full-field open tournaments, invitational tournaments do not offer open qualifying (aka Monday qualifying).  The Los Angeles Open was converted to an invitational in 2020, inheriting the National's format.

The field consisted of 120 players invited using the following criteria:
 Quicken Loans National winners from past five years
 The Players Championship and major championship winners in the last five years
 The Tour Championship and World Golf Championships winners in the past three years
 Arnold Palmer Invitational and Memorial Tournament winners in the past three years
 Tournament winner in past 12 months
 Prior year U.S. Amateur winner 
 Current PGA Tour members who were playing members on last named U.S. Ryder Cup team, European Ryder Cup team, U.S. Presidents Cup team, and International Presidents Cup team
 Top 125 from prior year FedEx Cup points list
 Top 10 from the current FedEx Cup points list (as of Friday prior)
 8 sponsors exemptions – 2 from Web.com Tour finals, 2 members not otherwise exempt, and 4 unrestricted
 Remaining positions filled from current year FedEx Cup point list

Winners

Note: Green highlight indicates scoring records.

References

External links

Coverage on the PGA Tour's official site

 

Former PGA Tour events
Golf in Maryland
Golf in Virginia
Golf in Pennsylvania
Tiger Woods
Recurring sporting events established in 2007
Recurring sporting events disestablished in 2018
2007 establishments in Maryland
2018 disestablishments in Maryland